Mill Run, West Virginia may refer to:
Mill Run, Pocahontas County, West Virginia, a ghost town in Pocahontas County
Mill Run, Tucker County, West Virginia, a ghost town in Tucker County